The 43rd annual Toronto International Film Festival was held from September 6 to 16, 2018. In June 2018, the TIFF organizers announced a program to ensure that at least 20 percent of all film critics and journalists given press accreditation to the festival were members of underrepresented groups, such as women and people of color. The People's Choice Award was won by Green Book, directed by Peter Farrelly.

Awards

Juries

Platform Jury 
Lee Chang-dong
Béla Tarr
Mira Nair

Canadian Feature Film Jury
Mathieu Denis 
Ali Özgentürk
Michelle Shephard

Short Cuts Film Jury
Claire Diao
Molly McGlynn
Michael Pearce

Programmes
The first slate of galas and special presentations was announced on July 24, 2018. The festival's lineup of Canadian films was announced on August 1, and the lineup for the Platform program was announced on August 8. Two days later, the Documentaries lineup was announced, with additional films added to the Midnight Madness programme. Additional films were added to respective lineups on August 14.

Gala presentations
 Beautiful Boy by Felix Van Groeningen
 Everybody Knows by Asghar Farhadi
 First Man by Damien Chazelle
 Green Book by Peter Farrelly
 The Hate U Give by George Tillman Jr.
 Hidden Man by Jiang Wen
 High Life by Claire Denis
 Husband Material by Anurag Kashyap
 Jeremiah Terminator LeRoy by Justin Kelly
 The Kindergarten Teacher by Sara Colangelo
 The Land of Steady Habits by Nicole Holofcener
 The Lie by Veena Sud
 Life Itself by Dan Fogelman
 Outlaw King by David Mackenzie
 A Private War by Matthew Heineman
 The Public by Emilio Estevez
 Shadow by Zhang Yimou
 A Star Is Born by Bradley Cooper
 What They Had by Elizabeth Chomko
 Widows by Steve McQueen

Special presentations
 22 July by Paul Greengrass
 American Woman by Jake Scott
 Anthropocene: The Human Epoch by Jennifer Baichwal, Nicholas de Pencier and Edward Burtynsky
 Baby by Liu Jie
 Ben Is Back by Peter Hedges
 Boy Erased by Joel Edgerton
 Burning by Lee Chang-dong
 Can You Ever Forgive Me? by Marielle Heller
 Capernaum by Nadine Labaki
 Cold War by Paweł Pawlikowski
 Colette by Wash Westmoreland
 The Death and Life of John F. Donovan by Xavier Dolan
 Dogman by Matteo Garrone
 Driven by Nick Hamm
 Duelles by Olivier Masset-Depasse
 A Faithful Man by Louis Garrel
 The Fall of the American Empire by Denys Arcand
 The Front Runner by Jason Reitman
 Giant Little Ones by Keith Behrman
 Girls of the Sun by Eva Husson
 Gloria Bell by Sebastián Lelio
 Greta by Neil Jordan
 The Grizzlies by Miranda de Pencier
 Hold the Dark by Jeremy Saulnier
 Hotel Mumbai by Anthony Maras
 The Hummingbird Project by Kim Nguyen
 If Beale Street Could Talk by Barry Jenkins
 Kursk by Thomas Vinterberg
 Legend of the Demon's Cat by Chen Kaige
 Manto by Nandita Das
 Maya by Mia Hansen-Løve
 Mid90s by Jonah Hill
 A Million Little Pieces by Sam Taylor-Johnson
 Monsters and Men by Reinaldo Marcus Green
 Mouthpiece by Patricia Rozema
 Never Look Away by Florian Henckel von Donnersmarck
 Non-Fiction by Olivier Assayas
 The Old Man & the Gun by David Lowery
 Papi Chulo by John Butler
 La Quietud by Pablo Trapero
 Red Joan by Trevor Nunn
 Roma by Alfonso Cuarón
 Shoplifters by Hirokazu Kore-eda
 The Sisters Brothers by Jacques Audiard
 Skin by Guy Nattiv
 Sunset by László Nemes
 Teen Spirit by Max Minghella
 Tell It to the Bees by Annabel Jankel
 Through Black Spruce by Don McKellar
 Viper Club by Maryam Keshavarz
 Vision by Naomi Kawase
 Vita and Virginia by Chanya Button
 Vox Lux by Brady Corbet
 The Wedding Guest by Michael Winterbottom
 The Weekend by Stella Meghie
 Where Hands Touch by Amma Asante
 White Boy Rick by Yann Demange
 Wildlife by Paul Dano
 Wild Rose by Tom Harper

Special events
 The Joy Luck Club by Wayne Wang
 Sharkwater Extinction by Rob Stewart

Documentaries
 American Dharma by Errol Morris
 Angels Are Made of Light by James Longley
 The Biggest Little Farm by John Chester
 Carmine Street Guitars by Ron Mann
 Divide and Conquer: The Story of Roger Ailes by Alexis Bloom
 The Elephant Queen by Victoria Stone and Mark Deeble
 Fahrenheit 11/9 by Michael Moore
 Free Solo by E. Chai Vasarhelyi and Jimmy Chin
 Freedom Fields by Naziha Arebi
 Ghost Fleet by Shannon Service and Jeffrey Waldron
 Graves Without a Name by Rithy Panh
 Heartbound by Janus Metz Pedersen and Sine Plambech
 Maiden by Alex Holmes
 Maria by Callas by Tom Volf
 Meeting Gorbachev by Werner Herzog and André Singer
 Monrovia, Indiana by Frederick Wiseman
 Prosecuting Evil: The Extraordinary World of Ben Ferencz by Barry Avrich
 Putin's Witnesses by Vitaly Mansky
 Quincy by Rashida Jones and Alan Hicks
 Reason by Anand Patwardhan
 Screwball by Billy Corben
 Searching for Ingmar Bergman by Margarethe von Trotta
 The Truth About Killer Robots by Maxim Pozdorovkin
 This Changes Everything by Tom Donahue
 Walking on Water by Andrey Paounov
 What Is Democracy? by Astra Taylor
 When Arabs Danced by Jawad Rhalib
 Women Make Film: A New Road Movie Through Cinema by Mark Cousins

Contemporary World Cinema
 The Accused by Gonzalo Tobal
 Angel by Koen Mortier
 El Angel by Luis Ortega
 Asako I & II by Ryūsuke Hamaguchi
 Before the Frost by Michael Noer
 Belmonte by Federico Veiroj
 Birds of Passage by Cristina Gallego and Ciro Guerra
 Black '47 by Lance Daly
 The Black Book by Valeria Sarmiento
 Border by Ali Abbasi
 Bulbul Can Sing by Rima Das
 Core of the World by Natalia Meshchaninova
 The Dive by Yona Rozenkier
 Donbass by Sergei Loznitsa
 The Factory by Yuri Bykov
 Falls Around Her by Darlene Naponse
 The Fireflies Are Gone by Sébastien Pilote
 Florianópolis Dream by Ana Katz
 The Great Darkened Days by Maxime Giroux
 I Do Not Care If We Go Down in History as Barbarians by Radu Jude
 Jinpa by Pema Tseden
 Kingsway by Bruce Sweeney
 Let Me Fall by Baldvin Zophoníasson
 Look at Me by Nejib Belkadhi
 Minuscule - Mandibles from Far Away by Thomas Szabo and Hélène Giraud
 The Most Beautiful Couple by Sven Taddicken
 Museum by Alonso Ruizpalacios
 Night/Ext by Ahmad Abdalla
 One Last Deal by Klaus Härö
 The Other Story by Avi Nesher
 Quién te cantará by Carlos Vermut
 The Realm by Rodrigo Sorogoyen
 Redemption by Boaz Yehonatan Yacov and Joseph Madmony
 Retrospekt by Esther Rots
 Roads in February by Katherine Jerkovic
 Rosie by Paddy Breathnach
 Les Salopes, or the Naturally Wanton Pleasure of Skin by Renée Beaulieu
 Sew the Winter to My Skin by Jahmil X.T. Qubeka
 Sibel by Çagla Zencirci and Guillaume Giovanetti
 Splinters by Thom Fitzgerald
 Stupid Young Heart by Selma Vilhunen
 Styx by Wolfgang Fischer
 The Sweet Requiem by Ritu Sarin and Tenzing Sonam
 That Time of Year by Paprika Steen
 Ulysses & Mona by Sébastien Betbeder
 The Vice of Hope by Edoardo De Angelis
 Winter Flies by Olmo Omerzu
 Working Woman by Michal Aviad

Discovery
 Akasha by Hajooj Kuka
 Aniara by Pella Kågerman and Hugo Lilja
 Blind Spot by Tuva Novotny
 The Chambermaid by Lila Avilés
 Clara by Akash Sherman
 Complicity by Kei Chikaura
 Consequences by Darko Štante
 The Crossing by Bai Xue
 The Day I Lost My Shadow by Soudade Kaadan
 The Dig by Andy Tohill and Ryan Tohill
 Edge of the Knife by Gwaai Edenshaw and Helen Haig-Brown
 An Elephant Sitting Still by Hu Bo
 Emu Runner by Imogen Thomas
  by Carolina Hellsgård
 The Extraordinary Journey of Celeste Garcia by Arturo Infante
 Farming by Adewale Akinnuoye-Agbaje
 Fig Tree by Alamork Davidian
 Firecrackers by Jasmin Mozaffari
 Float Like a Butterfly by Carmel Winters
 Freaks by Zach Lipovsky and Adam Stein
 Girl by Lukas Dhont
 Gwen by William McGregor
 Helmet Heads by Neto Villalobos
 Her Job by Nikos Labôt
 Icebox by Daniel Sawka
 Jirga by Benjamin Gilmour
 Light as Feathers by Rosanne Pel
 Lionheart by Genevieve Nnaji
 The Load by Ognjen Glavonić
 Manta Ray by Phuttiphong Aroonpheng
 The Mercy of the Jungle by Joël Karekezi
 Orange Days by Arash Lahooti
 Our Body by Han Ka-ram
 Parade by Nino Zhvania
 Phoenix by Camilla Strøm Henriksen
 Rafiki by Wanuri Kahiu
 Saf by Ali Vatansever
 Screwdriver by Bassam Jarbawi
 Summer Survivors by Marija Kavtaradze
 Tel Aviv on Fire by Sameh Zoabi
 The Third Wife by Ash Mayfair
 Tito and the Birds by Gabriel Bitar, André Catoto and Gustavo Steinberg
 Too Late to Die Young by Dominga Sotomayor Castillo
 Touch Me Not by Adina Pintilie
 Twin Flower by Laura Luchetti
 Woman at War by Benedikt Erlingsson

Masters
 3 Faces by Jafar Panahi
 Ash Is Purest White by Jia Zhang-ke
 Divine Wind by Merzak Allouache
 Hotel by the River by Hong Sang-soo
 The Image Book by Jean-Luc Godard
 Killing by Shinya Tsukamoto
 Loro by Paolo Sorrentino
 Our Time by Carlos Reygadas
 Peterloo by Mike Leigh
 Transit by Christian Petzold
 The Wild Pear Tree by Nuri Bilge Ceylan

Midnight Madness
 Assassination Nation by Sam Levinson
 Climax by Gaspar Noé
 Diamantino by Gabriel Abrantes and Daniel Schmidt
 Halloween by David Gordon Green
 In Fabric by Peter Strickland
 The Man Who Feels No Pain by Vasan Bala
 Nekrotronic by Kiah Roache-Turner
 The Predator by Shane Black
 The Standoff at Sparrow Creek by Henry Dunham
 The Wind by Emma Tammi

Platform
 Angelo by Markus Schleinzer
 Cities of Last Things by Ho Wi Ding
 Destroyer by Karyn Kusama
 Donnybrook by Tim Sutton
 The Good Girls by Alejandra Márquez Abella
 Her Smell by Alex Ross Perry
 The Innocent by Simon Jaquemet
 Jessica Forever by Caroline Poggi and Jonathan Vinel
 Lady J (Mademoiselle de Joncquières) by Emmanuel Mouret
 Out of Blue by Carol Morley
 The River by Emir Baigazin
 Rojo by Benjamín Naishtat

Short Cuts
 7A by Zachary Russell
 Accidence by Guy Maddin, Evan Johnson and Galen Johnson
 Animal Behaviour by Alison Snowden and David Fine
 Biidaaban (The Dawn Comes) by Amanda Strong
 Brotherhood (Ikhwène) by Meryam Joobeur
 Caroni by Ian Harnarine
 Dziadzio by Aaron Ries
 Emptying the Tank by Caroline Monnet
 EXIT by Claire Edmondson
 Fauve by Jérémy Comte
 GIRLFRIENDS (AMIES) by Marie Davignon
 Glitter's Wild Women by Roney
 Good Boy by Fantavious Fritz
 If This Isn't Love (Si ce n'est pas de l'amour) by Luiza Cocora
 Little Waves (Les petites vagues) by Ariane Louis-Seize
 My Boy (Mon Boy) by Sarah Pellerin
 Norman Norman by Sophy Romvari
 Paseo by Matthew Hannam
 The Subject (Le sujet) by Patrick Bouchard
 Veslemøy's Song by Sofia Bohdanowicz

Wavelengths
 Altiplano by Malena Szlam
 ante mis ojos by Lina Rodriguez
 Dead Souls by Wang Bing
 Erased,___Ascent of the Invisible by Ghassan Halwani
 Fausto by Andrea Bussmann
 In My Room by Ulrich Köhler
 La Flor by Mariano Llinás
 Long Day's Journey into Night by Bi Gan
 The Grand Bizarre by Jodie Mack
 Ray  & Liz by Richard Billingham
 Sira by Rolla Tahir
 Slip by Celia Perrin Sidarous
 The Stone Speakers by Igor Drljaca
 The Trial by Sergei Loznitsa
 What you Gonna Do When the World's on Fire? by Roberto Minervini

Primetime
 Ad Vitam
 Folklore
 Homecoming
 Sorry for Your Loss
 Stockholm

Canada's Top Ten
TIFF's annual Canada's Top Ten list, of the films selected by festival programmers as the year's ten best Canadian feature and short films, was released on December 5.

Unlike in prior years, the films selected for the Top Ten list were not screened at a dedicated festival in January 2019, but instead each received its own standalone theatrical run at the TIFF Bell Lightbox throughout the year.

Feature films

Short films

References

External links

 Official site
 2018 Toronto International Film Festival at IMDb

2018
2018 film festivals
2018 in Toronto
2018 in Canadian cinema